Hornak, Horňák, or Horniak (Czech/Slovak feminine: Horňáková, Horniaková) is a Czech and Slovak surname.

People

Hornak
 Ian Hornak (1944–2002), American draughtsman, painter, and printmaker
 Mark R. Hornak (born 1956), American judge
 Rosemary Hornak (born 1951), American visual artist

Horňák, Horňáková
 Michal Horňák (born 1970), Czech footballer and manager
 Peter Horňák (born 1964), Slovak water polo player
 Dominika Horňáková (born 1991), Slovak handball player

Horniak, Horniaková
 Eugen Horniak (1926–2004), Slovak basketball player
 Šimon Horniak (born 2001), Slovak footballer

See also
 
Hornyak

Czech-language surnames
Slovak-language surnames